John F. Albano (September 12, 1922 – May 23, 2005) was an American writer who worked in the comic book industry.  He was recognized for his work with the Shazam Award for Best Writer (Humor Division) in 1971, and the Shazam Award for Best Individual Short Story (Dramatic) in 1972 for "The Demon Within", in House of Mystery #201 (with Jim Aparo).

Albano's most famous co-creation is the western anti-hero Jonah Hex for DC Comics; he was the writer of books ranging from Adventure Comics to House of Mystery to Archie. Albano wrote stories for comic book novels and wrote for Archie Comics until about 2003.

Albano died in an Orlando hospital after suffering a heart attack and subsequent stroke. He was still active and was working on a musical play at the time of his death. He was 82.

References

Jonah Hex
1922 births
2005 deaths
American comics writers
American writers of Italian descent